The MixColumns operation performed by the Rijndael cipher, along with the ShiftRows step, is the primary source of diffusion in Rijndael. Each column is treated as a four-term polynomial  which are elements within the field . The coefficients of the polynomials are elements within the prime sub-field . 

Demonstration

Polynomial multiplication

 

where:

Modular reduction

The result  is a seven-term polynomial, which must be reduced to a four-byte word, which is done by doing the multiplication modulo .

If we do some basic polynomial modular operations we can see that:

In general, we can say that 

So

 

where

Matrix representation

This demonstrates that the operation itself is similar to a Hill cipher. It can be performed by multiplying a coordinate vector of four numbers in Rijndael's Galois field by the following circulant MDS matrix:

Implementation example

This can be simplified somewhat in actual implementation by replacing the multiply by 2 with a single shift and conditional exclusive or, and replacing a multiply by 3 with a multiply by 2 combined with an exclusive or.  A C example of such an implementation follows:

void gmix_column(unsigned char *r) {
    unsigned char a[4];
    unsigned char b[4];
    unsigned char c;
    unsigned char h;
    /* The array 'a' is simply a copy of the input array 'r'
     * The array 'b' is each element of the array 'a' multiplied by 2
     * in Rijndael's Galois field
     * a[n] ^ b[n] is element n multiplied by 3 in Rijndael's Galois field */ 
    for (c = 0; c < 4; c++) {
        a[c] = r[c];
        /* h is 0xff if the high bit of r[c] is set, 0 otherwise */
        h = (r[c] >> 7) & 1; /* arithmetic right shift, thus shifting in either zeros or ones */
        b[c] = r[c] << 1; /* implicitly removes high bit because b[c] is an 8-bit char, so we xor by 0x1b and not 0x11b in the next line */
        b[c] ^= h * 0x1B; /* Rijndael's Galois field */
    }
    r[0] = b[0] ^ a[3] ^ a[2] ^ b[1] ^ a[1]; /* 2 * a0 + a3 + a2 + 3 * a1 */
    r[1] = b[1] ^ a[0] ^ a[3] ^ b[2] ^ a[2]; /* 2 * a1 + a0 + a3 + 3 * a2 */
    r[2] = b[2] ^ a[1] ^ a[0] ^ b[3] ^ a[3]; /* 2 * a2 + a1 + a0 + 3 * a3 */
    r[3] = b[3] ^ a[2] ^ a[1] ^ b[0] ^ a[0]; /* 2 * a3 + a2 + a1 + 3 * a0 */
}

A C# example

private byte GMul(byte a, byte b) { // Galois Field (256) Multiplication of two Bytes
    byte p = 0;

    for (int counter = 0; counter < 8; counter++) {
        if ((b & 1) != 0) {
            p ^= a;
        }

        bool hi_bit_set = (a & 0x80) != 0;
        a <<= 1;
        if (hi_bit_set) {
            a ^= 0x1B; /* x^8 + x^4 + x^3 + x + 1 */
        }
        b >>= 1;
    }

    return p;
}

private void MixColumns() { // 's' is the main State matrix, 'ss' is a temp matrix of the same dimensions as 's'.
    Array.Clear(ss, 0, ss.Length);

    for (int c = 0; c < 4; c++) {
        ss[0, c] = (byte)(GMul(0x02, s[0, c]) ^ GMul(0x03, s[1, c]) ^ s[2, c] ^ s[3, c]);
        ss[1, c] = (byte)(s[0, c] ^ GMul(0x02, s[1, c]) ^ GMul(0x03, s[2, c]) ^ s[3,c]);
        ss[2, c] = (byte)(s[0, c] ^ s[1, c] ^ GMul(0x02, s[2, c]) ^ GMul(0x03, s[3, c]));
        ss[3, c] = (byte)(GMul(0x03, s[0,c]) ^ s[1, c] ^ s[2, c] ^ GMul(0x02, s[3, c]));
    }

    ss.CopyTo(s, 0);
}

Test vectors for MixColumn()

InverseMixColumns

The MixColumns operation has the following inverse (numbers are decimal):

Or:

Galois Multiplication lookup tables 

Commonly, rather than implementing Galois multiplication, Rijndael implementations simply use pre-calculated lookup tables to perform the byte multiplication by 2, 3, 9, 11, 13, and 14.

For instance, in C# these tables can be stored in Byte[256] arrays. In order to compute
p * 3
The result is obtained this way:
result = table_3[(int)p]

Some of the most common instances of these lookup tables are as follows:

Multiply by 2:
0x00,0x02,0x04,0x06,0x08,0x0a,0x0c,0x0e,0x10,0x12,0x14,0x16,0x18,0x1a,0x1c,0x1e,
0x20,0x22,0x24,0x26,0x28,0x2a,0x2c,0x2e,0x30,0x32,0x34,0x36,0x38,0x3a,0x3c,0x3e,
0x40,0x42,0x44,0x46,0x48,0x4a,0x4c,0x4e,0x50,0x52,0x54,0x56,0x58,0x5a,0x5c,0x5e,
0x60,0x62,0x64,0x66,0x68,0x6a,0x6c,0x6e,0x70,0x72,0x74,0x76,0x78,0x7a,0x7c,0x7e,	
0x80,0x82,0x84,0x86,0x88,0x8a,0x8c,0x8e,0x90,0x92,0x94,0x96,0x98,0x9a,0x9c,0x9e,
0xa0,0xa2,0xa4,0xa6,0xa8,0xaa,0xac,0xae,0xb0,0xb2,0xb4,0xb6,0xb8,0xba,0xbc,0xbe,
0xc0,0xc2,0xc4,0xc6,0xc8,0xca,0xcc,0xce,0xd0,0xd2,0xd4,0xd6,0xd8,0xda,0xdc,0xde,
0xe0,0xe2,0xe4,0xe6,0xe8,0xea,0xec,0xee,0xf0,0xf2,0xf4,0xf6,0xf8,0xfa,0xfc,0xfe,
0x1b,0x19,0x1f,0x1d,0x13,0x11,0x17,0x15,0x0b,0x09,0x0f,0x0d,0x03,0x01,0x07,0x05,
0x3b,0x39,0x3f,0x3d,0x33,0x31,0x37,0x35,0x2b,0x29,0x2f,0x2d,0x23,0x21,0x27,0x25,
0x5b,0x59,0x5f,0x5d,0x53,0x51,0x57,0x55,0x4b,0x49,0x4f,0x4d,0x43,0x41,0x47,0x45,
0x7b,0x79,0x7f,0x7d,0x73,0x71,0x77,0x75,0x6b,0x69,0x6f,0x6d,0x63,0x61,0x67,0x65,
0x9b,0x99,0x9f,0x9d,0x93,0x91,0x97,0x95,0x8b,0x89,0x8f,0x8d,0x83,0x81,0x87,0x85,
0xbb,0xb9,0xbf,0xbd,0xb3,0xb1,0xb7,0xb5,0xab,0xa9,0xaf,0xad,0xa3,0xa1,0xa7,0xa5,
0xdb,0xd9,0xdf,0xdd,0xd3,0xd1,0xd7,0xd5,0xcb,0xc9,0xcf,0xcd,0xc3,0xc1,0xc7,0xc5,
0xfb,0xf9,0xff,0xfd,0xf3,0xf1,0xf7,0xf5,0xeb,0xe9,0xef,0xed,0xe3,0xe1,0xe7,0xe5

Multiply by 3:
0x00,0x03,0x06,0x05,0x0c,0x0f,0x0a,0x09,0x18,0x1b,0x1e,0x1d,0x14,0x17,0x12,0x11,
0x30,0x33,0x36,0x35,0x3c,0x3f,0x3a,0x39,0x28,0x2b,0x2e,0x2d,0x24,0x27,0x22,0x21,
0x60,0x63,0x66,0x65,0x6c,0x6f,0x6a,0x69,0x78,0x7b,0x7e,0x7d,0x74,0x77,0x72,0x71,
0x50,0x53,0x56,0x55,0x5c,0x5f,0x5a,0x59,0x48,0x4b,0x4e,0x4d,0x44,0x47,0x42,0x41,
0xc0,0xc3,0xc6,0xc5,0xcc,0xcf,0xca,0xc9,0xd8,0xdb,0xde,0xdd,0xd4,0xd7,0xd2,0xd1,
0xf0,0xf3,0xf6,0xf5,0xfc,0xff,0xfa,0xf9,0xe8,0xeb,0xee,0xed,0xe4,0xe7,0xe2,0xe1,
0xa0,0xa3,0xa6,0xa5,0xac,0xaf,0xaa,0xa9,0xb8,0xbb,0xbe,0xbd,0xb4,0xb7,0xb2,0xb1,
0x90,0x93,0x96,0x95,0x9c,0x9f,0x9a,0x99,0x88,0x8b,0x8e,0x8d,0x84,0x87,0x82,0x81,	
0x9b,0x98,0x9d,0x9e,0x97,0x94,0x91,0x92,0x83,0x80,0x85,0x86,0x8f,0x8c,0x89,0x8a,
0xab,0xa8,0xad,0xae,0xa7,0xa4,0xa1,0xa2,0xb3,0xb0,0xb5,0xb6,0xbf,0xbc,0xb9,0xba,
0xfb,0xf8,0xfd,0xfe,0xf7,0xf4,0xf1,0xf2,0xe3,0xe0,0xe5,0xe6,0xef,0xec,0xe9,0xea,	
0xcb,0xc8,0xcd,0xce,0xc7,0xc4,0xc1,0xc2,0xd3,0xd0,0xd5,0xd6,0xdf,0xdc,0xd9,0xda,	
0x5b,0x58,0x5d,0x5e,0x57,0x54,0x51,0x52,0x43,0x40,0x45,0x46,0x4f,0x4c,0x49,0x4a,
0x6b,0x68,0x6d,0x6e,0x67,0x64,0x61,0x62,0x73,0x70,0x75,0x76,0x7f,0x7c,0x79,0x7a,	
0x3b,0x38,0x3d,0x3e,0x37,0x34,0x31,0x32,0x23,0x20,0x25,0x26,0x2f,0x2c,0x29,0x2a,
0x0b,0x08,0x0d,0x0e,0x07,0x04,0x01,0x02,0x13,0x10,0x15,0x16,0x1f,0x1c,0x19,0x1a

Multiply by 9:
0x00,0x09,0x12,0x1b,0x24,0x2d,0x36,0x3f,0x48,0x41,0x5a,0x53,0x6c,0x65,0x7e,0x77,
0x90,0x99,0x82,0x8b,0xb4,0xbd,0xa6,0xaf,0xd8,0xd1,0xca,0xc3,0xfc,0xf5,0xee,0xe7,
0x3b,0x32,0x29,0x20,0x1f,0x16,0x0d,0x04,0x73,0x7a,0x61,0x68,0x57,0x5e,0x45,0x4c,
0xab,0xa2,0xb9,0xb0,0x8f,0x86,0x9d,0x94,0xe3,0xea,0xf1,0xf8,0xc7,0xce,0xd5,0xdc,
0x76,0x7f,0x64,0x6d,0x52,0x5b,0x40,0x49,0x3e,0x37,0x2c,0x25,0x1a,0x13,0x08,0x01,
0xe6,0xef,0xf4,0xfd,0xc2,0xcb,0xd0,0xd9,0xae,0xa7,0xbc,0xb5,0x8a,0x83,0x98,0x91,
0x4d,0x44,0x5f,0x56,0x69,0x60,0x7b,0x72,0x05,0x0c,0x17,0x1e,0x21,0x28,0x33,0x3a,
0xdd,0xd4,0xcf,0xc6,0xf9,0xf0,0xeb,0xe2,0x95,0x9c,0x87,0x8e,0xb1,0xb8,0xa3,0xaa,	
0xec,0xe5,0xfe,0xf7,0xc8,0xc1,0xda,0xd3,0xa4,0xad,0xb6,0xbf,0x80,0x89,0x92,0x9b,	
0x7c,0x75,0x6e,0x67,0x58,0x51,0x4a,0x43,0x34,0x3d,0x26,0x2f,0x10,0x19,0x02,0x0b,
0xd7,0xde,0xc5,0xcc,0xf3,0xfa,0xe1,0xe8,0x9f,0x96,0x8d,0x84,0xbb,0xb2,0xa9,0xa0,
0x47,0x4e,0x55,0x5c,0x63,0x6a,0x71,0x78,0x0f,0x06,0x1d,0x14,0x2b,0x22,0x39,0x30,
0x9a,0x93,0x88,0x81,0xbe,0xb7,0xac,0xa5,0xd2,0xdb,0xc0,0xc9,0xf6,0xff,0xe4,0xed,
0x0a,0x03,0x18,0x11,0x2e,0x27,0x3c,0x35,0x42,0x4b,0x50,0x59,0x66,0x6f,0x74,0x7d,	
0xa1,0xa8,0xb3,0xba,0x85,0x8c,0x97,0x9e,0xe9,0xe0,0xfb,0xf2,0xcd,0xc4,0xdf,0xd6,
0x31,0x38,0x23,0x2a,0x15,0x1c,0x07,0x0e,0x79,0x70,0x6b,0x62,0x5d,0x54,0x4f,0x46

Multiply by 11 (0xB):
0x00,0x0b,0x16,0x1d,0x2c,0x27,0x3a,0x31,0x58,0x53,0x4e,0x45,0x74,0x7f,0x62,0x69,
0xb0,0xbb,0xa6,0xad,0x9c,0x97,0x8a,0x81,0xe8,0xe3,0xfe,0xf5,0xc4,0xcf,0xd2,0xd9,
0x7b,0x70,0x6d,0x66,0x57,0x5c,0x41,0x4a,0x23,0x28,0x35,0x3e,0x0f,0x04,0x19,0x12,
0xcb,0xc0,0xdd,0xd6,0xe7,0xec,0xf1,0xfa,0x93,0x98,0x85,0x8e,0xbf,0xb4,0xa9,0xa2,
0xf6,0xfd,0xe0,0xeb,0xda,0xd1,0xcc,0xc7,0xae,0xa5,0xb8,0xb3,0x82,0x89,0x94,0x9f,
0x46,0x4d,0x50,0x5b,0x6a,0x61,0x7c,0x77,0x1e,0x15,0x08,0x03,0x32,0x39,0x24,0x2f,
0x8d,0x86,0x9b,0x90,0xa1,0xaa,0xb7,0xbc,0xd5,0xde,0xc3,0xc8,0xf9,0xf2,0xef,0xe4,
0x3d,0x36,0x2b,0x20,0x11,0x1a,0x07,0x0c,0x65,0x6e,0x73,0x78,0x49,0x42,0x5f,0x54,
0xf7,0xfc,0xe1,0xea,0xdb,0xd0,0xcd,0xc6,0xaf,0xa4,0xb9,0xb2,0x83,0x88,0x95,0x9e,
0x47,0x4c,0x51,0x5a,0x6b,0x60,0x7d,0x76,0x1f,0x14,0x09,0x02,0x33,0x38,0x25,0x2e,
0x8c,0x87,0x9a,0x91,0xa0,0xab,0xb6,0xbd,0xd4,0xdf,0xc2,0xc9,0xf8,0xf3,0xee,0xe5,
0x3c,0x37,0x2a,0x21,0x10,0x1b,0x06,0x0d,0x64,0x6f,0x72,0x79,0x48,0x43,0x5e,0x55,
0x01,0x0a,0x17,0x1c,0x2d,0x26,0x3b,0x30,0x59,0x52,0x4f,0x44,0x75,0x7e,0x63,0x68,
0xb1,0xba,0xa7,0xac,0x9d,0x96,0x8b,0x80,0xe9,0xe2,0xff,0xf4,0xc5,0xce,0xd3,0xd8,
0x7a,0x71,0x6c,0x67,0x56,0x5d,0x40,0x4b,0x22,0x29,0x34,0x3f,0x0e,0x05,0x18,0x13,
0xca,0xc1,0xdc,0xd7,0xe6,0xed,0xf0,0xfb,0x92,0x99,0x84,0x8f,0xbe,0xb5,0xa8,0xa3

Multiply by 13 (0xD):
0x00,0x0d,0x1a,0x17,0x34,0x39,0x2e,0x23,0x68,0x65,0x72,0x7f,0x5c,0x51,0x46,0x4b,
0xd0,0xdd,0xca,0xc7,0xe4,0xe9,0xfe,0xf3,0xb8,0xb5,0xa2,0xaf,0x8c,0x81,0x96,0x9b,
0xbb,0xb6,0xa1,0xac,0x8f,0x82,0x95,0x98,0xd3,0xde,0xc9,0xc4,0xe7,0xea,0xfd,0xf0,
0x6b,0x66,0x71,0x7c,0x5f,0x52,0x45,0x48,0x03,0x0e,0x19,0x14,0x37,0x3a,0x2d,0x20,
0x6d,0x60,0x77,0x7a,0x59,0x54,0x43,0x4e,0x05,0x08,0x1f,0x12,0x31,0x3c,0x2b,0x26,
0xbd,0xb0,0xa7,0xaa,0x89,0x84,0x93,0x9e,0xd5,0xd8,0xcf,0xc2,0xe1,0xec,0xfb,0xf6,
0xd6,0xdb,0xcc,0xc1,0xe2,0xef,0xf8,0xf5,0xbe,0xb3,0xa4,0xa9,0x8a,0x87,0x90,0x9d,
0x06,0x0b,0x1c,0x11,0x32,0x3f,0x28,0x25,0x6e,0x63,0x74,0x79,0x5a,0x57,0x40,0x4d,
0xda,0xd7,0xc0,0xcd,0xee,0xe3,0xf4,0xf9,0xb2,0xbf,0xa8,0xa5,0x86,0x8b,0x9c,0x91,
0x0a,0x07,0x10,0x1d,0x3e,0x33,0x24,0x29,0x62,0x6f,0x78,0x75,0x56,0x5b,0x4c,0x41,
0x61,0x6c,0x7b,0x76,0x55,0x58,0x4f,0x42,0x09,0x04,0x13,0x1e,0x3d,0x30,0x27,0x2a,
0xb1,0xbc,0xab,0xa6,0x85,0x88,0x9f,0x92,0xd9,0xd4,0xc3,0xce,0xed,0xe0,0xf7,0xfa,
0xb7,0xba,0xad,0xa0,0x83,0x8e,0x99,0x94,0xdf,0xd2,0xc5,0xc8,0xeb,0xe6,0xf1,0xfc,
0x67,0x6a,0x7d,0x70,0x53,0x5e,0x49,0x44,0x0f,0x02,0x15,0x18,0x3b,0x36,0x21,0x2c,
0x0c,0x01,0x16,0x1b,0x38,0x35,0x22,0x2f,0x64,0x69,0x7e,0x73,0x50,0x5d,0x4a,0x47,
0xdc,0xd1,0xc6,0xcb,0xe8,0xe5,0xf2,0xff,0xb4,0xb9,0xae,0xa3,0x80,0x8d,0x9a,0x97

Multiply by 14 (0xE):
0x00,0x0e,0x1c,0x12,0x38,0x36,0x24,0x2a,0x70,0x7e,0x6c,0x62,0x48,0x46,0x54,0x5a,
0xe0,0xee,0xfc,0xf2,0xd8,0xd6,0xc4,0xca,0x90,0x9e,0x8c,0x82,0xa8,0xa6,0xb4,0xba,
0xdb,0xd5,0xc7,0xc9,0xe3,0xed,0xff,0xf1,0xab,0xa5,0xb7,0xb9,0x93,0x9d,0x8f,0x81,
0x3b,0x35,0x27,0x29,0x03,0x0d,0x1f,0x11,0x4b,0x45,0x57,0x59,0x73,0x7d,0x6f,0x61,
0xad,0xa3,0xb1,0xbf,0x95,0x9b,0x89,0x87,0xdd,0xd3,0xc1,0xcf,0xe5,0xeb,0xf9,0xf7,
0x4d,0x43,0x51,0x5f,0x75,0x7b,0x69,0x67,0x3d,0x33,0x21,0x2f,0x05,0x0b,0x19,0x17,
0x76,0x78,0x6a,0x64,0x4e,0x40,0x52,0x5c,0x06,0x08,0x1a,0x14,0x3e,0x30,0x22,0x2c,
0x96,0x98,0x8a,0x84,0xae,0xa0,0xb2,0xbc,0xe6,0xe8,0xfa,0xf4,0xde,0xd0,0xc2,0xcc,
0x41,0x4f,0x5d,0x53,0x79,0x77,0x65,0x6b,0x31,0x3f,0x2d,0x23,0x09,0x07,0x15,0x1b,
0xa1,0xaf,0xbd,0xb3,0x99,0x97,0x85,0x8b,0xd1,0xdf,0xcd,0xc3,0xe9,0xe7,0xf5,0xfb,
0x9a,0x94,0x86,0x88,0xa2,0xac,0xbe,0xb0,0xea,0xe4,0xf6,0xf8,0xd2,0xdc,0xce,0xc0,
0x7a,0x74,0x66,0x68,0x42,0x4c,0x5e,0x50,0x0a,0x04,0x16,0x18,0x32,0x3c,0x2e,0x20,
0xec,0xe2,0xf0,0xfe,0xd4,0xda,0xc8,0xc6,0x9c,0x92,0x80,0x8e,0xa4,0xaa,0xb8,0xb6,
0x0c,0x02,0x10,0x1e,0x34,0x3a,0x28,0x26,0x7c,0x72,0x60,0x6e,0x44,0x4a,0x58,0x56,
0x37,0x39,0x2b,0x25,0x0f,0x01,0x13,0x1d,0x47,0x49,0x5b,0x55,0x7f,0x71,0x63,0x6d,
0xd7,0xd9,0xcb,0xc5,0xef,0xe1,0xf3,0xfd,0xa7,0xa9,0xbb,0xb5,0x9f,0x91,0x83,0x8d

References 

 FIPS PUB 197: the official AES standard (PDF file)

See also

 Advanced Encryption Standard

Finite fields
Advanced Encryption Standard